Bagong Umaga (International title: New Beginnings / ) is a 2020 Philippine television drama romance series broadcast by Kapamilya Channel. Directed by Carlo Po Artillaga and Paco Sta. Maria, it stars Heaven Peralejo, Tony Labrusca, Barbie Imperial, Kiko Estrada, Michelle Vito and Yves Flores. The series aired on the network's Kapamilya Gold afternoon block and worldwide via The Filipino Channel from October 26, 2020, to April 30, 2021, on Monday to Friday at 2:30 PM, replacing Love Thy Woman.

Plot
Diana was overwhelmed with grief after being denied a medical operation on her newborn child, resulting in the baby’s death. She then sets out to inflict those she claims to be responsible for her child's death: the Veradonas. Thus, Joanna Magbanua and Catherine Veradona were the infants switched by Diana in the nursery at Buencorazon Hospital. It is later revealed that she swapped two more infants the same night: Raphael Florentino and Eduardo Ponce.

The Magbanuas, Veradonas, and Florentinos eventually learn that their infants were switched at the hospital, changing the courses of their lives upon learning of their children’s true identities.

Cast

Main
 Tony Labrusca as Raphael "Ely" Florentino / Raphael Ponce
 Barbie Imperial as Catherine "Cai" B. Veradona / Catherine Magbanua†
 Kiko Estrada as Daniel "Otep" Jacinta Jr.
 Michelle Vito as Agnes "Angge" delos Santos / Bella Silang
 Yves Flores as Eduardo "Dodong" Ponce / Eduardo Florentino
 Heaven Peralejo as Joanna "Tisay" Magbanua / Joanna B. Veradona

Supporting
 Rio Locsin as Hilda Delgado-Veradona
 Glydel Mercado as Diana Silang-Jacinta†
 Sunshine Cruz as Dra. Margaret "Maggie" Buencorazon-Veradona 
 Cris Villanueva as Dr. Christian "Ian" D. Veradona 
 Keempee de Leon as Joselito "Jose" Magbanua
 Nikki Valdez as Monica Magbanua
 Bernadette Allyson as Irene Florentino
 Richard Quan as Matthew L. Florentino 
 Ali Abinal as Gabriel "Gab" Florentino†
 Peewee O’Hara as Pepita "Lola Pet" Delos Santos
 Moi Bien as Gigi Santos

Guest
 Junjun Quintana as Jude M. Silang
 Jenny Miller as Jenny Ponce†
 Priscilla Meirelles as Olivia Chavez
 Johnny Revilla as Hernando Buencorazon
 Giovanni Baldisseri as Wally Ramos

Production
The project was first unveiled on June 12, 2020, with a working title Cara Y Cruz. Julia Barretto, Loisa Andalio, Ronnie Alonte and Marco Gumabao were initially cast for the leading roles.

On September 30, Julia Barretto confirmed that she was no longer part of the project after being transferred to Viva Artists Agency, along with Loisa Andalio and Ronnie Alonte, who are now under KreativDen. The series was later renamed to Bagong Umaga. From March 29–31 and April 5, 2021, the series aired replays under the title Bagong Umaga: Rewind.

Timeslot block
This is the last series that airs at 2:30 PM (via Kapamilya Channel) or 3:30 PM original schedule timeslot (via ABS-CBN Channel 2) every afternoon in last 2021 and was replaced by reruns of Dolce Amore.

This is the series that decided airing the reruns of Asintado.

This series was currently aired on Kapamilya Online Live Global every Tuesday to Saturday, 11:30 pm to 1:00 am and was replaced by  All of Me.

See also
List of programs broadcast by Kapamilya Channel
List of programs broadcast by A2Z (Philippine TV channel)
List of programs broadcast by ABS-CBN
List of ABS-CBN drama series

References

External links

ABS-CBN drama series
Philippine melodrama television series
Philippine romance television series
2020 Philippine television series debuts
2021 Philippine television series endings
Filipino-language television shows
Television shows set in the Philippines